Song Khon is a village and tambon (sub-district) of Fak Tha District, in Uttaradit Province, Thailand. In 2005 it had a population of 3,379 people. The tambon contains 11 villages.

References

Tambon of Uttaradit province
Populated places in Uttaradit province